The Guardians Drum and Bugle Corps is an Open Class competitive junior drum and bugle corps. Based in Dallas, Texas, the Guardians perform in Drum Corps International (DCI) competitions.

History
Johnathan Doerr, a 19-year-old student at Texas Tech University approached his best friend, Isaac Lee, former drum major of the Blue Devils with the idea of a community-based local touring drum corps in the Central Texas area.  On October 28, 2012, Doerr founded the Central Texas Drum Corps Initiative in San Marcos, the organization which would become the Guardians Drum and Bugle Corps. A meeting was held in Seguin in December to gauge community support.  With 25 people attending, a decision was made to go forward with developing the future performing unit with its base relocated to Seguin.

When, in early 2013, DCI announced the introduction of two new activities for small competitive units, DrumLine Battle and SoundSport, Doerr saw that he could use SoundSport as a means of helping to start the new corps.

The inaugural membership/rehearsal meeting of the Guardians was held in Seguin in March. Fifteen potential members were in attendance. Aid and assistance was soon forthcoming from established drum corps such as Open Class corps Genesis and Legends, Texas' World Class corps the Crossmen, and all-age corps the Vigilantes, as well as music businesses, interested individuals, and DCI. The corps also grew in size, rapidly approaching the SoundSport maximum of 50, with members coming from throughout Texas.

In June, the Guardians Drum and Bugle Corps undertook a short, in-state tour, giving several performances and concluding with a SoundSport exhibition at the DCI Southwestern Championship regional competition at the Alamodome in San Antonio.

Continuing to develop slowly, with an eye focused on the financial bottom line, the Guardians entered DCI Open Class competition in 2014.  Fielding a corps of 112 members (56 brass, 16 battery percussion, 12 front ensemble, 24 auxiliary/guard, 4 drum majors), the unit entered only two contests, both in its home state of Texas, at Round Rock (which was rained out) and San Antonio.

In April 2015, the Guardians again relocated, this time to Houston.

In 2016, the corps had a much longer season, including a three-week-long spring training (which is as long as most world class corps) which was located at a college, whereas most if not all open class corps have spring training at a high school, and eight competitions, including both open class and world class finals, as opposed to the previous year's three. In addition, the corps received a sponsorship from System Blue, and as such, got new instruments from them. The Guardians are the only open class corp to use System Blue instruments in DCI history other than the Blue Devils B and C corps.

Show summary (2013–2022)
Source:

References

External links
Official website

Drum Corps International Open Class corps
Musical groups established in 2012
Organizations based in Texas
2012 establishments in Texas